Wonderland is the eighth studio album by English band Take That. It was released on 24 March 2017 through Polydor Records.

Background 
On 22 October 2016 Take That announced the album and its release date along with the tour dates in support of it, which started in May 2017. It was also confirmed that Robbie Williams and Jason Orange would not be rejoining the band for the album and tour. The band worked with various producers on the album including Tony Hoffer, Stuart Price and Mike Crossey.

Critical reception
David Smyth from the London Evening Standard gave a positive three-star review, calling it "Enough to thrill the masses, and business as usual", and wrote: "Their eighth album overall feels like business as usual too, with a full sound, rich in arm-waving choruses and blandly uplifting lyrics ("Music makes me feel good," "We can conquer any mountain," "Every morning is a brand new day," etc.)." Michael Cragg from The Guardian gave a mixed two-star review, calling Take That "The boyband equivalent of a Reliant Robin", and went on to write: "the overwhelming feeling is of an album made purely to justify taking the show around the arenas. While that's not exactly a new concept, the cynicism of the idea bleeds into the music, with most of the tracks built around cavernous, chant heavy choruses."

Promotion

Singles 
"Giants" was released on 17 February 2017 as the first single and was produced by Mark Ralph. it peaked at 13 on the UK Singles Chart.

"New Day" was released on 5 May 2017 as the second single.

Tour 
On 22 October 2016, Take That announced that they would embark on a UK arena and stadium tour in support of the album. The Wonderland Live tour began on 5 May 2017 in Birmingham, England at the Genting Arena and concluded on 22 November 2017, in Auckland, New Zealand, at The Trusts Arena.

Commercial performance
Wonderland debuted at number two on the UK Albums Chart with first week equivalent sales of 113,200 copies, giving Take That their eighth top five studio album. Held off the top spot by Ed Sheeran's ÷, it became Take That's first album not to reach number one since Take That & Party peaked at number two in 1992. It reached number three in Ireland and also peaked at two in Scotland.

Track listing

Personnel
Credits adapted from the liner notes.

Take That
 Gary Barlow – vocals, keyboards, programming (tracks 5, 6, 9)
 Mark Owen – vocals
 Howard Donald – vocals

Additional personnel
 Ryan Carline – keyboards and engineering (tracks 1, 3‒7, 9‒12), vocal production (1), programming (4), vocal engineering (8)
 Charlie Russell – programming (tracks 1, 5, 10, 13), keyboards and additional engineering (2), mixing (13)
 Ben Mark – guitar (tracks 1, 5, 10, 13), programming (1)
 Paul Turner – bass guitar (tracks 1, 5, 10, 13)
 Jamie Norton – piano, keyboards (tracks 1, 10, 13)
 Ash Soan – drums (tracks 1, 10, 13)
 Mike Stevens – saxophone (track 1)
 Nicolas Magriel – sarangi, tanpura (track 1)
 Jon Green – acoustic guitar, keyboards (track 5)
 Dan Broughton – drums (track 5)
 Tom Rees-Roberts, Andy Greenwood – trumpet (track 5)
 Pete Beachill, Richard Wigley – trombone (track 5)
 Philip Jewson – horn arrangement and conducting (track 5)
 Tom Upex – engineering (tracks 1, 5, 10, 13)
 Jonny Solway – assistant engineering (track 1), engineering (5, 10, 13)
 Charlie Rolfe – assistant engineering (tracks 5, 10, 13)
 Jack Hudson – assistant engineering (tracks 10, 13)
 Mark Ralph – bass guitar, guitar, synthesizer, programming (tracks 2, 3, 14), mandolin, ukulele (3)
 Geoff Holroyde – drums (tracks 2, 3, 14), backing vocals (2)
 Scott Ralph – horns, percussion (track 3)
 Tom AD Fuller – assistant engineering (tracks 2, 14), backing vocals (2), engineering (3)
 Drew Smith – assistant engineering (tracks 2, 14), engineering (3)
 Hayley Carline – backing vocals (tracks 3‒5)
 Andy Caine – backing vocals (tracks 3, 5)
 Will Malone – strings arrangement and conducting (tracks 2, 3, 11)
 Perry Montague‐Mason – strings leader (tracks 2, 3, 11)
 Isobel Griffiths – string contractor (tracks 2, 3, 11)
 Susie Gillis – assistant string contractor (tracks 2, 3, 11)
 Stuart Price – keyboards, programming (tracks 4, 6, 9), bass guitar, mixing (4), guitar (6, 9)
 Simon Strömstedt – backing vocals, keyboards, programming (track 4)
 Tony Hoffer – bass guitar, guitar, synthesizer, programming and engineering (tracks 7, 11, 12), mixing (12)
 Dave Palmer – keyboards (tracks 7, 11, 12)
 Denny Weston Jr. – drums (tracks 7, 11)
 Tom Baxter – guitar and string arrangement (track 7)
 Oli Langford – violin, viola and string arrangement (track 7)
 Danny Keane – cello (track 7)
 Cameron Lister – engineering (tracks 7, 11, 12), mixing (12)
 Mike Crossey – bass guitar, synthesizer, programming (track 8)
 Jonathan Gilmore – guitar and recording engineering (track 8)
 Rosie Crossey – drums (track 8)
 TSA "The Session Agency" – gospel choir (track 14)
 Priscilla Jones – gospel choir arrangement (track 14)
 Matt Furmidge and Dominic Joshua Alexander Liu for Metrophonic Productions – keyboards (track 15)
 Rosie Danvers at Wired Strings – strings (track 15)
 Sigma – production (track 15)
 Scott Rosser – mastering (track 15)
 Mark "Spike" Stent – mixing
 Geoff Swan – assistant mixing
 Michael Freeman – assistant mixing (except tracks 2, 3)
 Tim Young – mastering (except track 15)

Charts

Weekly charts

Year-end charts

Certifications

References 

Take That albums
2017 albums